The Napoléon class was a late type of 90-gun ships of the line of the French Navy, and the first type of ship of the line designed from the start to incorporate a steam engine.

Designed by Henri Dupuy de Lôme, the prototype Napoléon displayed such outstanding performances during her trials that a production series was immediately ordered, yielding the Algésiras sub-class. Further improvements to the Algésiras type yielded the Ville de Nantes sub-class.

The Napoléon class was thus quickly promoted to 2nd-rank ships, also reflecting the status provided by their nautical performances.

Units

Napoléon 90 (launched 16 May 1850 at Toulon) – Stricken 1876

Algésiras sub-class
Algésiras 90 (launched 4 October 1855 at Toulon) – Transport 1869
Arcole 90 (launched 20 March 1855 at Cherbourg) – Stricken 1870
Redoutable 90 (launched 25 October 1855 at Rochefort) – Stricken 1869
Impérial 90 (launched 15 September 1856 at Brest) – Hulked 1869
Intrépide 90 (launched 17 September 1864 at Rochefort) – Stricken 1889

Ville de Nantes sub-class 
Ville de Nantes 90 (launched 7 August 1858 at Cherbourg) – Stricken 1872
Ville de Bordeaux 90 (launched 21 May 1860 at Lorient) – Stricken 1879
Ville de Lyon 90 (launched 26 February 1861 at Brest) – Stricken 1883

References

90-gun ship of the line classes
Ship of the line classes from France
 
Ship classes of the French Navy